The 19th Canadian Parliament was in session from 16 May 1940, until 16 April 1945.  The membership was set by the 1940 federal election on 26 March 1940, and it changed only somewhat due to resignations and by-elections until it was dissolved prior to the 1945 election.

It was controlled by a Liberal Party majority under Prime Minister William Lyon Mackenzie King and the 16th Canadian Ministry.  The Official Opposition was the so-called "National Government" party (the name which the Conservatives ran under in the 1940 election), led in the House by Richard Hanson and Gordon Graydon consecutively as the three successive national leaders of the party, Robert Manion, Arthur Meighen and John Bracken did not have seats in the House of Commons. With the selection of Bracken as national leader in December 1942, the party became known as the Progressive Conservatives.

The Speaker was James Allison Glen.  See also List of Canadian electoral districts 1933-1947 for a list of the ridings in this parliament.

There were six sessions of the 19th Parliament:

List of members 

Following is a full list of members of the nineteenth Parliament listed first by province, then by electoral district.

Electoral districts denoted by an asterisk (*) indicates that district was represented by two members.

Alberta

British Columbia

Manitoba

New Brunswick

Nova Scotia

Ontario

Prince Edward Island

Quebec

Saskatchewan

Yukon

By-elections

References

Canadian parliaments
1940 establishments in Canada
1945 disestablishments in Canada
1940 in Canada
1941 in Canada
1942 in Canada
1943 in Canada
1944 in Canada
1945 in Canada